Shen Tianfeng (Chinese: 沈田峰; Pinyin: Shěn Tiánfēng; born 18 March 1994 in Shenyang) is a Chinese football player.

Club career
Shen started his football career in 2011 when he was loaned to China League Two club Xi'an Laochenggen for one year. He made 13 appearances and scored four goals in the 2011 league season. He was promoted to Guizhou Renhe's first team squad by Gao Hongbo in the summer of 2012. On 19 July 2012, he made his debut and scored his first goal for Guizhou Renhe in the fourth round of 2012 Chinese FA Cup which Guizhou beat Dalian Shide 2–0. His Super League debut came on 9 days later, on 28 July, in a 3–1 away defeat against Henan Jianye, coming on as a substitute for Liu Tianqi in the 55th minute. He scored his first Super League goal on 6 October 2012, which ensured Guizhou Renhe beat Shanghai Shenhua 4–2 at Guiyang Olympic Sports Center. He made five appearances and scored two goals in the 2012 season as the club achieved fourth place in the Super League and runners-up in the FA Cup and gained the entry into AFC Champions League for the first time. 

He was loaned to Shaanxi Laochenggen again in March 2013. On 6 July 2013, Shen joined China League One side Chongqing FC on loan until 31 December. He played only one match for Chongqing FC (against Harbin Yiteng on 14 July) and returned to Guizhou after Chongqing relegated.

In 2018, Shen joined League Two side Suzhou Dongwu.

Career statistics 
Statistics accurate as of match played 31 December 2019.

References

Living people
1994 births
Footballers from Shenyang
Chinese footballers
Beijing Renhe F.C. players
Jiangxi Beidamen F.C. players
Suzhou Dongwu F.C. players
Chinese Super League players
China League One players
China League Two players
Association football forwards